Jim Eliot is an English songwriter, record producer and singer from London. He has written and produced for artists including Foxes, Ellie Goulding, Will Young, Kylie Minogue, Rae Morris and Olly Murs.

Eliot (synthesizer, vocals) is also a member of Kish Mauve, a British electropop group, which was formed in 2005 in London, England, alongside Mima Stilwell (vocals).

Discography

Kish Mauve

Album 
 Black Heart (2009)

Extended Play (EP) 
 Kish Mauve EP (2005)

Singles 
 "Modern Love" (2006)
 "Lose Control" (2008)
 "Come On" / "Morphine" (2009)

Production and writing

Discography

References

21st-century English musicians
English pop singers
English record producers
English songwriters
English keyboardists
Musicians from London
Living people
Year of birth missing (living people)